Shashti Poorti is a Sanskrit word meaning completion of sixty. Also known also as "Shashti Abda Poorti" or "Ugraratha Santi"is a Hindu ceremony celebrating the 60th birthday of a male and female.

Etymology
Shashti Poorti, or Shashtiabdha Poorthi, is celebrated on completion of 60 years of age. This term is derived from Sanskrit Shashti (English: Sixty); Poorti (English: Propitiate). It marks the completion of half the years of one's lifetime as in Hinduism, 120 years is considered the life span of a human being. The sixtieth year in one’s life is a significant milestone, a memorable turning point, a touching reminder of the rich, mellowed life that would unfold in the years to come. In fact, the Hindu calendar has 60 years (named Prabhav, Vibhav, etc.) that repeat themselves after every 60 years in an identical sequence. Shashti Poorti therefore marks the completion of one such cycle. For example, a person born in the year Pramodoot, having lived for 60 years will have seen all the 60 years in the calendar. This milestone marks celebration and gratitude for life given by the Almighty. So once the birthday arrives in Pramodoot year, the Shashti is Poorti. In recent days, children have started doing this ritual to honour their parents, just as their parents performed all of their rituals in their childhood.

One more important aspect of Shashti Poorti is that all the planets in the zodiac come to the same positions or occupy the same houses of zodiac as the actual date of birth of the individual. These planets take the same position as they were on the date of birth of the individual after 60 years. That is why the Celebration is performed on the same lunar day when the moon conjoins the birth star of the individual on the same month and the same year in which he was born.

The Veda says "Janmaabde, Janmamaasecha Swajanmadivase tathaa, Janmarshe chaiva kartavyaa santi rugrarathaahvayaa, Devaalaye nadeeteere swagruhe vaa subhasthale."

The sages and the rishis of yore have acknowledged the sanctity of the sixtieth year in one’s life and have drawn out elaborate rituals to mark this special event. They looked at it as rebirth and suggested the repetition of those rituals performed at one’s birth. Hence this celebration at this point of life is a sacred part of the hallowed Vedic culture.

Shashti Poorti Shanti should be performed in the sixty first year and in the same month and day of birth according to the Hindu Zodiac. This is considered to be the best option. In case it is not possible to time it exactly on the same day, allowance is given to perform it on a convenient day during and before the completion of sixtieth year. The choice of the place to carry out this tradition could be a pilgrim town, a temple, a river bank or even one's residence. As part of the celebrations the couple's children perform their parents' second wedding. This is reason for a grand family reunion to incorporate an important event in the couple's married life.

Shanti

The rituals carved out as part of Shanti are also referred to as Ugraratha Santi. Ugraratha is nothing but the harsh natured time. In a hundred-year time scale of man's life, pre-sixty is a period of materialistic pursuit while the post-sixty span is slated for spiritual endeavour. The Ugraratha Shanti is a prayer sent to the heavens to make the post-sixty span a spiritually fulfilling experience.

Three different ways are chiseled to carry out the Santi aspect. They are "Sounakoktam, Bodhaayanoktam and Saivaagamoktam".

The basic elements of these three ways remain the same, though the contents vary marginally. Of all, Saivaagamokta Shanti is very elaborate and ritual-laden. Given its exhaustive scope of rituals, only a limited few like the kings and the emperors can follow it in toto, though it is not entirely ruled out for devout householders.

Kranti

After the successful completion of the "Shanti" programme, the Kranthi programme follows in which "Kalyaanam" is very important. "Kranthi" means "to step ahead" and signifies heading towards a new life.

"Shastipoorti" is a good bridge - builder between the householder's domestic concerns and Vaanaprasta's spiritual yearnings. During Vaanaprastha, the married couple is to fulfill their life's mission by staying together through observance of celibacy. The "Kalyaana Veduka" is a reminder of the unique role they are to play in the years to come. Marriage in the younger days promises physical proximity, while the one performed now brings about spiritual affinity.

Thus the Shanti - Kranthi aspects, which run through the "Shastipoorthi" celebrations provide a fusion of spiritual and social obligations which are the very bed rock the Indian culture.

Ceremony

This ceremony should be performed as per Guru and elderly persons instructions. Generally this ceremony is two days programme. The ceremony is commenced in Shubha Muhurttam by performing "Yamuna Puja", followed by the "Ganga Puja", "Ishta Devata Vandana", "Sabha Vandana", "Punyaha with Panchagavya Sevana", "Nandi Puja", "Ritvikvarana" and Kalasha Sthapana".

Kalasha sthapana of the deities - "Maha Ganapati", "Adityadi Navagraha", "Mrtunjaya","Samvatsara-Ayana-Ritu-Maasa-Paksha-Yoga devataa", "Karana devataa", "Raashyaadhipati (husband and wife)", "Navadurga", "Saptama Maru Devataa", "Dwadasha Aditya  - Dhata, Aryama, Mitra, Varuna, Indra, Vivasvan, Tvashta, Vishnu, Anhuman, Bhaga, Pusha and Parjanya", "Ayurdevataa, Istadevata, Kuladevata". Next Avahana-Praana Pratishthaapanam, Shodashopachaara puja, Mahamangalaarati, Navagraha and Ganapati Homam.

References

Hindu traditions
Marriage in Hinduism